Middleville is an unincorporated community located within Stillwater Township, in Sussex County, New Jersey, United States. Middleville has a post office with ZIP code 07855.

References

Stillwater Township, New Jersey
Unincorporated communities in Sussex County, New Jersey
Unincorporated communities in New Jersey